Edward Ormiston Baptiste (born Baptist; 9 March 1883 – 19 June 1907) was an  Australian rules footballer who played with South Melbourne in the Victorian Football League (VFL).

Although born Edward Ormiston Baptist, he was known by the surname Baptiste during his playing career.

Notes

External links 

1883 births
1907 deaths
Australian rules footballers from Victoria (Australia)
Sydney Swans players